William Perault, (c. 1190 – 1271), also spelled Perauld; Latinized Peraldus or Peraltus, was a Dominican writer and preacher.

Life
He was born at Peyraud, France. He studied at the Sorbonne University of Paris, and there, being drawn to the religious life by the preaching perhaps of Jordan of Saxony, he was received into the Dominican Order.

It is thought that Perault was somewhat advanced in years when he embraced the religious state, although the precise date of his entrance into it is also unknown. He entered the order at Paris, but was destined, according to a custom then existing, for the convent at Lyons. At Lyons, where he passed his life, at once contemplative and active, he rendered service to the Church by the brilliancy of his writings and preaching and by the charm and splendour of his virtues.

His part in ecclesiastical affairs was for a time also very important. For fully ten years he performed all the episcopal functions of the Church of Lyons, having been chosen for this work during the vacancy of the see by Philip I, Count of Savoy who, although not in Holy orders, bore the title of Archbishop of Lyon from 1245 to 1267. Because of Perault's long labours in ministering to the needs of the diocese, he himself came to be known as the Bishop or Archbishop of Lyon. This error was further emphasized by the title of bishop which a later hand added to many of his writings. Authors such as Gerson, Père Alexandre, Jacques Échard, and Hurter say that William Perault was never Archbishop of Lyons, as the Gallia christiana asserts, Dupin is not justified in saying that he was never more than a religious of the Order of Preachers (cf. Antoine Touron, Hist. des hommes illust., 1, l.2, 184).

Known and reverenced far and wide for singular gifts of nature and grace, he was a man truly powerful in word and work-well deserving the triple title given him by all, of monk, doctor, and apostle. He died at Lyons.

Writings
His most important works are: 
Summa de virtutibus et vitiis (Cologne, 1497, 1618, 1629; Venice, 1492, 1497; Rome, 1557; Lyons, 1668)
Sermones de tempore et de sanctis, which appeared under the name of William III of Paris (Paris, 1494; Cologne, 1629)
De eruditione seu de institutione religiosorum (Paris, 1512; Louvain, 1575; Lyons, 1585)
De regimine principum, which, as in the Roman edition of 1570, was attributed to Saint Thomas Aquinas and of which, in fact, St. Thomas wrote a part: "Speculum religiosorum seu institutionum vitae spiritualis", which appeared under the name of Humbert de Romans, Master-General of the Order of Preachers.

References

External links
 Guillelmus Peraldus in Bibliotheca Augustana
 Lewis E 166 Summa de virtutibus (Treatise on the virtues); Summa vitiorum (Treatise on the vices) at OPenn

French Dominicans
University of Paris alumni
1190 births
1271 deaths
13th-century Latin writers
13th-century French writers